George Arthur Atkins (April 10, 1932 – January 21, 2015) was an American football offensive lineman. After a college football career at Auburn, he played one season with the Detroit Lions of the National Football League.

Atkins returned to Auburn as an assistant coach to Ralph Jordan in 1956, coaching in various positions, including offensive line. He resigned after the 1971 season to take on a business position in Birmingham, Alabama.

Atkins married former Leah Rawls, 1953 World water skiing champion and later historian at Auburn University, in 1954. He died in 2015.

References 

1932 births
2015 deaths
American football offensive guards
Auburn Tigers football players
Detroit Lions players
Players of American football from Birmingham, Alabama